The Official Opposition Shadow Cabinet of the 41st Legislative Assembly of Ontario, Canada was the shadow cabinet of the main Opposition party, responsible for holding Ministers to account and for developing and disseminating the party's policy positions. In the 41st Legislative Assembly of Ontario, which lasted from 2014 until 2018, the Official Opposition was formed by the Progressive Conservative Party of Ontario. The Progressive Conservative MPP's not in the final shadow cabinet were former leader Tim Hudak and Jack MacLaren as well as Michael Harris. Elliott left politics and resigned her seat in 2015.

See also
Executive Council of Ontario
Ontario New Democratic Party Shadow Cabinet of the 41st Legislative Assembly of Ontario

Progressive Conservative Party of Ontario